is a Japanese shōjo and yaoi manga artist who has made several appearances at anime and manga conventions in the United States, as well as in Germany. Her first U.S. appearance was at the initial Yaoi-Con in San Francisco in 2001 (Yaoi-Con 2001, 3). She is known especially for her drawings of beautiful fantasy men in romantic storylines set in historical Europe, such as Gorgeous Carat in early 20th-century France and Cantarella during the Italian Renaissance.

Her comic art influences include Osamu Tezuka, Hayao Miyazaki, and the Showa 24 generation of women manga artists led by Moto Hagio who created girls' comics in the 1970s (Yaoi-Con 2001, 3; Higuri Q & A, 2004). She has also found inspiration in Franco-Belgian comics or bandes dessinées.

Published works
(This list does not include her dōjinshi or self-published comics.)
 Azel Seimaden, 1994 - prequel to Seimaden
 Sento no Hishin, 1994
 , 1994-1999
 Lost Angel, 1996
 Ludwig II 1996-1998
 Kamen no Romanesque (Mask of Romance), 1997 - Not written by artist; based on a Takarazuka Revue play.
 Zoku: Cutlass, 1997-1998
 Zeus, 1997-1998
 Ramen Ikaga!? 1995 (original) & 1997
 Shinkyoku (Divine Comedy), 1998
 Gorgeous Carat: Virtue of Darkness, 1999-2002 - A young French nobleman finds himself caught up in the maneuvers of the famous jewel thief Noir.
 Tenshi no Hitsugi: Ave Maria (Angel's Coffin: Ave Maria), 2000
 Tenshi ni Bara no Hanataba o (Rose Bouquet for an Angel), 2000-2001 (also called: L'alleluja des Anges) - Sei turns into a girl when he is around white roses. Only a kiss will change him back.
 Cutlass: Shōnen tachi no toki (Cutlass: A Time for Boys), 2000 - pirate manga
 Poison artbook, 2000 - Color and monochrome illustrations from Seimaden, Ludwig II, Gorgeous Carat, and other manga.
 Cantarella, 2000–2010
 Flower, 2001
 My Little Lover, 2002
 Gorgeous Carat Galaxy, 2004 - One-shot sequel to Gorgeous Carat.
 Gakuen Heaven (School Heaven), 2004 - A scenario from SPRAY's "Boy's Love Scramble!" game.
 Taisho Era Chronicles, 2005
 Crown, 2005–2008 - Art only; writer Shinji Wada.
 Night Head Genesis anime, 2006 - Did character design.
 Night Head Genesis manga, 2006 - vols. 1, 2, and 3
 Jewel artbook, 2006

References

Yaoi-Con 2001 Convention Guide (Biseinen-ya, 2001): 3-7.
FanimeCon 2004 guide (Anime Resource Group, Inc., 2004): 7.
Guests of Honor press conference, FanimeCon 2004, San Jose, California, May 29, 2004.
Yaoi-Con No. 5 (2005): 2.
AnimeCons.com Convention Information, "Anime Central" guests (accessed September 2, 2007).
Kinokuniya BookWeb in-house catalog (accessed 2004).

External links

Tiara: You Higuri Official Site  (Japanese)
Tiara: You Higuri Official Site (English translation, maintained by U.S. global manga publisher Go! Comi)
You Higuri interview, translation by Jeanne, Aestheticism.com, 2001; also published in Yaoi-Con 2001 Convention Guide.
Team Bonet Presents: A You Higuri Shrine, fan site with manga and character summaries, last updated 2002.
You Higuri at FanimeCon 2004, by Kat Avila, Sequential Tart, July 2004

 
Living people
Manga artists from Osaka Prefecture
Year of birth missing (living people)